Philip Allen Sparke (born 29 December 1951) is an English composer and musician born in London, noted for his concert band and brass band music.
His early major works include The Land of the Long White Cloud – "Aotearoa", written for the 1980 Centennial New Zealand Brass Band championship. He subsequently went on to win the EBU New Music for Band Competition three times, including in 1986 with a commission from the BBC called Orient Express.

Since May 2000, his music has been published under his own label Anglo Music Press, and distributed by Hal Leonard.

Notable achievements 
 1997 Sudler Prize - Dance Movements
 2000 Iles Medal of the Worshipful Company of Musicians - Services to brass bands
 2005 National Band Association/William D. Revelli Memorial Band Composition Contest - Music of the Spheres
 2011 BUMA International Brass Award - Contributions to brass music
 2016 National Band Association/William D. Revelli Memorial Band Composition Contest - A Colour Symphony
 2018 International Award - Midwest International Band and Orchestra Clinic

Works

Music for Wind Band and Brass Band 

 1973/1976 Gaudium
 1975 The Prizewinners for Brass-Band
 1978/1995 Fantasy for Euphonium
 1979/1985 A Concert Prelude
 1979 Capriccio (E-flat Cornet Solo) for Brass-Band
 1979/1987 The Land of the Long White Cloud "Aotearoa"
 1981 A Tameside Overture for Brass-Band
 1981 Fanfare, Romance & Finale for Brass-Band
 1981 Song and Dance (Cornet Solo) for Brass-Band
 1982 Barn Dance & Cowboy Hymn for Brass-Band
 1983 Rhythm and Blues for Brass-Band
 1984 Aubade (Euphonium Solo) for Brass-Band
 1984 Jubilee-Overture
 1984 A London Overture for Brass-Band
 1984 A Malvern Suite for Brass-Band
 1984 Slipstream (Concert-March)
 1984/1985 The Year of the Dragon
 Toccata
 Interlude
 Finale
 1985 A Celtic Suite for Brass-Band
 Dawns Werin
 Suo Gan
 Men of Harlech
 1985 Masquerade (E-flat Horn Solo) for Brass-Band
 1985/1987 Music for a Festival
 Con brio
 Andantino
 Vivo
 1985 Skyrider (Concert-March) for Brass-Band
 1986/1992 Orient Express
 1986/1994 Pantomime (Euphonium Solo)
 1986 Party Piece (Euphonium Solo) for Brass-Band
 1986 Prelude, Toccata & Fugue (Graduation Day) for Brass-Band
 1986 Variations on an Enigma for Brass-Band
 1987 Flying the Breeze
 1987 Mountain Song for Brass-Band
 1988 A Swiss Festival Overture
 1988 Concertino for Tuba (E-flat Tuba Solo) for Brass-Band
 1988 Concerto Grosso (Brass Quartet & Band) for Brass-Band
 1988 Endeavour (Australia 1788–1988) a Programmatic Rhapsody for Brass-Band
 The unknown continent
 Terra Australis
 The new challenge
 1988 River City Serenade for Brass-Band
 1988 Serenade for Toni
 1989 Partita for Brass-Band
 1989 The sunken village for Fanfare Orchestra
 1989 A Tameside Overture
 1989 Theatre Music
 Overture
 Entr'acte
 Finale
 1989 The Vikings
 1989/1990 Two-part Invention (Euphonium Duet)
 1990 Cambridge Variations for Brass-Band
 1990 Fanfare, Romance, Finale
 1990/1992 A Pittsburgh Overture
 1990 Sinfonietta Nr. 1
 Overture
 Aria
 Scherzo
 1990 Triptych for Brass-Band
 1990 A Yorkshire Overture
 1991 Celebration
 1991 Concerto for Trumpet or Cornet for Brass-Band
 1992 Euphonism (Euphonium Duet) for Brass-Band
 1992 Jamaica Farewell
 1992/1996 Jubilee-Prelude
 1992 Serenade for Horns (E-flat Horn Trio) for Brass-Band
 1992 Festival Overture
 1992 Mountain Song
 1992 Mambo Jumbo
 1992 River City Serenade
 1992 Sinfonietta Nr. 2
 Overture
 Serenade
 Finale
 1992 Soliloquy (Cornet Solo) for Brass-Band
 1993 Processional Overture
 1993 Song for Ina (Euphonuim Solo) for Brass-Band
 1993 Tijuana Trumpets (Trumpet feature)
 1994 Three Miniatures for Brass-Band
 1995 Dance Movements
 Ritmico
 Molto vivo (for Woodwinds)
 Lento (for the Brass)
 Molto ritmico
 1995 Euphonium Concerto No 1 for Brass-Band
 1996 Fiesta
 1996 White Rose Overture
 1996 Music for Arosa
 1997 Norwegian Rondo
 1997 Time to Say Goodbye for Brass-Band
 1998 Between the Moon and Mexico for Brass-Band
 1998 Diversions – Variations on a Swiss Folk Song "Der Heimetvogel"
 Theme
 Variation 1 (Vivo e scherzando)
 Variation 2 (Subito meno mosso)
 Variation 3 (Lento espressivo)
 Variation 4 (Vivace)
 1999 Earth, Water, Sun, Wind Symphony for Band 
 Commissioned by the Northern Arizona University Wind Symphony for their Centennial Celebration
 Earth 
 Water
 Sun
 Wind
 1999 Hanover Festival
 Commissioned by the Hanover Wind Symphony for their Fifteenth Anniversary
 1999 Lindisfarne Rhapsody (Flute Solo)
 1999 Tallis Variations for Brass-Band
 1999 Wilten Festival Overture
 2000 The Centurion for Brass-Band
 2000 Five Festive Fanfares
 2000 Navigation Inn (Concert March)
 2000 Overture for Woodwinds (woodwind orchestra)
 2000 Time Remembered
 2000 To a New Dawn
 2001 Carol of the Shepherds
 2001 Ballad for Benny
 2001 Four Norfolk Dances
 Pulham Prelude
 Diss Dance
 Lopham Lament
 Garboldisham Gigue
 2001 Infinity and Beyond...

 2001 Invictus (The Unconquered)
 2001 A London Intrada
 2001 Navigation Inn for Brass-Band
 2001 The Prince of Denmark's March
 2001 Shalom! (Suite of Israeli Folk Songs)
 V'ha'ir Shushan & Havdala
 Hanerot Halalu & Ba'olam Haba
 Mishenichnas Adar, Ani Purim & Yom Tov Lanu
 2001 South Down Pictures for Brass-Band
 2001 Sunrise at Angel's Gate
 2001 Te Deum Prelude
 2001 Time Remembered for Brass-Band
 2001 Two Norwegian Folk Tunes
 2002 Alladale from Hymn of the Highlands (Flugel, Horn and Baritone Trio) for Brass-Band
 2002 Big Sky Ouverture
 2002 Mary's Boy Child
 2002 Merry-Go-Round
 2002 Morning Song – for Horn Quartet and Band
 2002 Pathfinders March
 2002 Portrait of a City
 2002 Sinfonietta No 3 (Rheinfelden Sketches)
 Promenade
 Ballad
 Interlude
 Scherzo
 2002/2003 Suite from "Hymn of the Highlands"
 Ardross Castle
 Alladale
 Dundonnell
 2002 Flowerdale from "Hymn of the Highlands" (Soprano Cornet Solo) for Brass-Band
 2002 Lairg Muir from "Hymn of the Highlands" (Cornet Solo)  for Brass-Band
 2002 Strathcarron from "Hymn of the Highlands" (Sword Dance) for Brass-Band
 2002 Summer Isles from "Hymn of the Highlands" (Euphonium Solo) for Brass-Band
 2002 The White Rose
 2003 Aria (Tenor Horn Solo) for Brass-Band
 2003 Clarinet Calypso
 2003 Clarinet Concerto
 2003 A Huntingdon Celebration
 Commissioned by the Huntingdonshire Concert Band to celebrate their 10th Anniversary
 2003 Kaleidoscope – Five Variations on the "Brugg Song"
 Introduction
 Theme
 Variation I
 Variation II
 Variation III
 Variation IV
 Variation V
 2003 Masquerade (A Willisau Celebration)
 Overture
 Elegy
 Interlude
 Finale
 2003 Out of the Darkness, Into the Light 
 2003 Prelude and Scherzo (Trombone solo) for Brass-Band
 2003 Simple Sarabande
 2003 Ten Chorale Preludes
 2003 Veni Immanuel
 2003 Westminster Prelude
 2004 Between the two Rivers
 2004 Choral and Variations
 2004 A Klezmer Karnival 
 2004 Flying the Breeze
 2004 Harlequin (Euphonium Solo)
 2004 La Caracolá
 2004 Mandalen Landscapes
 2004 Manhattan (Trumpet Solo)
 2004 Marchissimo
 2004 Music of the Spheres for Brass-Band
 t = 0 – Big Bang
 The Lonely Planet
 Asteroids and Shooting Stars 
 Music of the Spheres
 Harmonia
 The Unknown
 2004/2005 Portrait of a Music
 2004 Postcard from Singapore
 2004 Summer Scene for Brass-Band
 2004 The Bandwagon for Brass-Band
 2004 The Four Noble Truths
 Dukkha
 Samudaya
 Nirodha
 Magga
 2005 Jeanie with the Light Brown Hair
 2005 Jubilate for Brass-Band
 2005 The Painted Desert
 2005 The Pioneers
 2005 Variants on an English Hymn Tune (Euphonium Solo)
 2005 In The Bleak Mid-Winter (Re-arg)
 2005 When the Spirit Soars
 2006 Valerius Variations
 2006 Tuba Concerto
 2006 Trombone Concerto
 2006 Dances and Alleluias for Brass Band
 2006 Parade Of The Clockwork Soldiers'
 2007 Albion Heritage for wind ensemble
 Commissioned by The Association for Music in International Schools (AMIS) for the 2008 International Honor Band. World premier on 15 March 2008 in London, UK, at the AMIS 2008 International Band and Choir Festival.
 Harmony Music for Brass-Band
 2007 Legend of Celobrium commissioned by the Harmonie de Soleuvre, Luxembourg, to celebrate their 100th Anniversary
 2007 A Monmouth Overture commissioned for Monmouth School Symphonic Wind band
 2007 Tales of the River Wye commissioned for Monmouth School Junior Symphonic Wind Band
 2007 Music for Battle Creek for Brass-Band
 2007 Symphonic Metamorphosis on Themes from Saint-Saëns' 3rd Symphony 2008 Letter From Home commissioned by the James Madison University Brass Band, Harrisonburg, VA
 2008 The Roaring Forties for wind ensemble
 2009 Neapolitan Holiday for wind ensemble
 Commissioned by the Green Hope High School Symphonic Band and Wind Ensemble directed by Brian Myers. World premier on 21 May 2009 at the Meymandi Concert Hall in Raleigh, North Carolina, United States.
 2009 A Winter's Tale'' for concert band
 Commissioned by the Western Plains Wind Consortium, Daniel Baldwin, Founder and Director. World premiere on 1 December 2009 at the OPSU Centennial Theatre by the Oklahoma Panhandle State University Concert Band, under the direction of Dr. Matthew C. Saunders in Goodwell, Oklahoma, United States.
 2010 "Atlantic Odyssey" for concert band
 Commissioned by the Oakton High School Bands of Vienna, Virginia, United States. World premiere by director Dr. Cheryl Newton at Oakton High School on 12 June 2010 by the Oakton High School Symphonic Band.
 2010 "March Celebration" for concert band
 Commissioned by the Harmonie royale des sapeurs-pompiers d'Athus Bands of Athus, Belgium. World premiere on 23 October 2010 for the 135th anniversary of the Harmonie royale des sapeurs-pompiers d'Athus under the direction of Dr.Jean-Luc Becker at Centre Clemarais by the town's bands.
 2011 "Evolution: Five States of Change" for Brass Band
 2014 "A Colour Symphony" - Symphony No.3
 Commissioned by the "sinfonischen blasorchester wehdel", Thomas Ratzek, conductor, with funds provided by Stiftung Niedersächsischer Volksbanken und Raiffeisenbanken and Volksbank eG Bremerhaven-Cuxland. They gave the premiere on 22 November 2014 in the Stadttheater Bremerhaven, in the presence of the composer.
 2014 Wind Sketches
 Commissioned by the Tacoma Concert Band from Washington State, USA.
 Trade Winds
 Becalmed
 Riding the Storm
 2017 "Festival Prelude 'AD Excel'"
 Commissioned by the AD Concert Band to celebrate their 40th anniversary, by musical director Dr Trevor Farren.

National Championships of Great Britain test pieces
A number of Philip Sparke's compositions have been chosen as test pieces in the National Brass Band Championships of Great Britain. His pieces have been selected for various sections, both at the area contests and the national finals.

References

External links 
 Philip Sparke's Homepage

1951 births
Living people
20th-century classical composers
20th-century English composers
20th-century British male musicians
21st-century classical composers
21st-century British male musicians
English classical composers
English male classical composers
Alumni of the Royal College of Music
Brass band composers
Musicians from London